Harold Amenyah (born 22 September 1989) is a Ghanaian
actor, TV personality, fashion icon, host and businessman who has
worked as a brand influencer for popular brands including
telecommunication giant Tigo.

Education 
Amenyah was born at Osu in Accra, Ghana, he
schooled at Mfantsipim School for his secondary education, he then
moved on to University of Ghana where he studied and earned a
bachelor's degree in Economics and Mathematics.

Career 
He made his acting debut starring in a 2012 TV series "
Xoxo".

Amenyah moved on to feature in several Ghanaian movies and series both Akan and English such as Xoxo, 4play Reloaded, Honour my tears, A
Sting in a Tale, Wedding Night, Every Woman Has A Story, Sadia and Eden. Amenyah became a household name after his commercial for
Telecommunication company, Tigo debuted " Drop that Yam" which also featured Ghanaian actress Naa Ashorkor.

In 2019, through the Ministry of Tourism, Arts and Culture and a Barbados movie
production company, Amenyah and other Ghanaian actors were selected to star in a Year of return 2019 movie
titled "Joseph".
He played the character Nii.

Selected filmography

Films
A Sting in a Tale (2009)
4play Reloaded (2010)
Honour my tears (2015)
Every Woman Has A Story (2015)
Wedding night (2016)
Joseph (2019)

Television 
 2012, Xoxo (Ghanaian TV series)
 2017, Sadia (Ghanaian TV series)
 2020, Eden (Ghanaian TV series)

Awards 
 2015 Ghana Movie Awards – Winner of Best Dressed Male
Celebrity

 2018 Ghana Movie Awards – Nominee of Supporting Actor in a Drama
Series

 2018 EMY Africa Awards – Nominee of Man of the Year Style
category

References

External link
 
 https://haroldamenyah.net

Ghanaian actors
Ghanaian male film actors
1989 births
Living people
University of Ghana alumni